Tazos are disks that were distributed as promotional items with products of Frito-Lay and its subsidiaries around the world. The idea behind Tazos started out similar to Pogs, whereby each Tazo contained a score value, and a game was played to 'win' Tazos from other players.

Tazos have been released in several different formats, ranging from the original circular disks, to octagonal disks, and in later years, to resemble more of a collectible card. In addition to the Japanese Pog Battle game, some Tazo series feature small incisions around the outside, allowing players to fit them together and build objects. The Star Wars series also included additional pieces which allowed players to construct spaceships.

Tazos are commonly made from a plastic base, but some series have been produced from cardboard or aluminium (such as the Australian Yu-Gi-Oh! Metallix series).

Tazos series
Tazos started out with a set of 100 disks featuring the images of Looney Tunes characters and 124 Tiny Toons tazos in 1994. The disks were added to the products of Mexican snacks company Sabritas and were named after the expression taconazo (to kick with the heel) which was a reference to another popular school game in Mexico where children open bottles with their shoes trying to launch the caps the furthest.

Other sets from around the world include:
 Chiquito de la Calzada (1994, set of 10 in Spain, "chiqui tazos")
 Disney (1994, set of 91)
 Pocahontas (1994, set of 50)
 Los Caballeros del Zodiaco  (1994, set of 40)
 The Simpsons (1995, set of 100)
 Looney Tunes (1995, set of 100)
Monster Munch (1996, set of 30 plus a subsequent set of 10)
 Sailor Moon (1996, set of 100)
 The Mask (1998)
 Pokémon (1999, set of 51)
 Dinosaurio (2000, set of 51)
 Pokémon 2 (2000, set of 100)
 Digimon (2000)
 Pokémon 3 (2001)
 Cubi-Tazos featuring Scooby-Doo (TV, 2001, set of 24) Medabots (2002, set of 70 classic and 70 metalix)
 Dragonball GT (2003, set of 60 metalix)
 Yu-Gi-Oh! (2004, set of 101)
 Mucha Lucha (2005, set of 150)
 Mucha Lucha 2: La Revancha (2005, set of 180)
 Dragon Ball Z (2005)
 Megaman NT Warrior (2005 set of 29)
 Los Simpsons  (TV, 2006–2007, set of 144)
 Bob Esponja  (TV, 2007, set of 163 plus 5 in Cheetos)
 Pokémon 4 Generación Avanzada (2008, set of 235)
 El Tigre: Las Aventuras De Manny Rivera (2008, set of 200)
 WWE (TV, 2009, set of 176)
 Naruto (2009)
 Bakugan Battle Brawlers (TV, June–August 2009 in packages of Cheetos in India, set of 26) Nickelodeon (TV, 2010, set of 195)
 Shrek: Para Siempre  (film, 2010 in packages of Cheetos in Peru)
 Bakugan Battle Brawlers (TV, 2010 in Cheetos Sorpresa in Peru with the slogan "Descubre el Poder de los Tazos" , numbered set of 120)
 Star Wars (original trilogy)
 Chester Cheetah
 Space Jam
Australian Football League
 National Rugby League
 Beyblades 
Angry Birds (2011, including codes to unlock special branded levels)
 Jurassic World (2018)
 Bad Bunny (2019)
 Pac-Man (2020)

Countries 

Tazos have been released around the world, in bags of potato chips (crisps) and other snacks including Bollycao, Cheese Tris, Cheetos, Cheetos Sorpresa, Chizitos, Doritos, Fandangos, Lay's Potato Chips, Meridian Real Thai Chicken Sabritas, Piqueo Snax, Simba Chips, Smith's Potato Crisps, Thins, Twistees, Uncle Chipps, and Walkers.

Countries that have had Tazo releases include:

 Albania
 Argentina
 Australia
 Bahamas, The
 Bahrain
 Bangladesh
 Belarus
 Belgium
 Belize
 Botswana
 Brazil
 Bulgaria
 Chile
 Colombia
 Cyprus
 Dominican Republic
 Ecuador
 Egypt
 El Salvador
 Estonia
 France
 Gibraltar
 Greece
 Guatemala
 Honduras
 Hungary
 India
 Indonesia
 Israel
 Italy
 Japan
 Jordan
 Kenya
 Mexico
 Netherlands
 New Zealand
 Latvia
 Lithuania
 Oman
 Pakistan
 Panama
 Peru
 Poland
 Portugal
 Puerto Rico
 Qatar
 Romania
 Russian Federation
 Saudi Arabia
 South Africa
 South Korea
 Spain
 Thailand
 Trinidad and Tobago
 Turkey
 United Kingdom
 United States of America
 Uruguay
 Venezuela

Australian sets
Below is a list of official basic Australian Tazos and the year they were released.

The Yu-Gi-Oh! Metalix set did contain a couple bonus Tazos offered with a kids magazine K-Zone and at Shell petrol stations.

See also 
 Pogs
 Prizes

References

External links 
 Tazos Australia
 spakatak.com Australian Tazos Guide
 Tazos MEXICO

Fighting games
Anime industry
Collectible-based games
1990s toys
Street games